Park is the fifth album from The Mad Capsule Markets and their first to be released in the United States. The album shows the band start to incorporate rap metal influences, an element that would become crucial in their later style. The melodious elements from Mix-ism are still prominent in several tracks. The album is often considered to be one of the band's best works. Hide praised the album as a perfect example of state of the art Japanese Rock. The US release was accompanied by two bonus tracks (originally limited to the initial run of the original Japanese pressing).

Track listing
"Hi-Side (High-Individual-Side)"
"Limit"
"In Surface Noise"

"Hab'it"
"Cr'ock on the Work (Auto-matic)"

"P-A-R-K"
"Mustard"
"The Life in Fairy Story" ♠
 ♠

♠Limited Edition Pressing & U.S. Pressing Bonus Tracks

Charts

References

The Mad Capsule Markets albums
1994 albums